Alpha Tau Omega Fraternity House may refer to:

Alpha Tau Omega Fraternity House (West Lafayette, Indiana), listed on the National Register of Historic Places in Tippecanoe County, Indiana
Alpha Tau Omega Fraternity House (Reno, Nevada), listed on the National Register of Historic Places in Nevada
Alpha Tau Omega Fraternity House (Old), Eugene, Oregon, listed on the National Register of Historic Places in Lane County, Oregon